

The Latécoère 582 was a 1930s French long-range patrol flying-boat designed and built by Latécoère for the French Navy. First flown on 25 July 1935 the 583 was a parasol-wing monoplane flying-boat. Powered by three 890 hp (663 kW) Gnome-Rhône 14Kirs radial piston engines. The French Navy choose to buy the Breguet Bizerte and the one Latécoère 582 ended up as a flying test bed at Saint-Raphaël.

Specifications

See also

References

Notes

Bibliography

 

Flying boats
582
1930s French military reconnaissance aircraft
Trimotors
Parasol-wing aircraft
Aircraft first flown in 1935